() is a Japanese insurance company. Its businesses include Mitsui Sumitomo Insurance and Aioi Nissay Dowa Insurance. It is listed on the Nikkei 225.

History 
MS&AD Holdings, Inc.was incorporated in Apr 2008 as a holding company following; Mitsui Sumitomo Insurance Co., Ltd., Mitsui Sumitomo Kirameki Life Insurance Co., Ltd., Mitsui Sumitomo MetLife Insurance Co., Ltd. and Mitsui Direct General Insurance Co., Ltd..

In Sep 2009, MS&AD Holdings, Inc. published agreement to integrate of management between Aioi Insurance Co., Ltd., Nissay Dowa General Insurance Co., Ltd., and Mitsui Sumitomo Insurance Group Holdings, Inc..

In Apr 2010, MS&AD Holdings, Inc. was changed company name as MS&AD Insurance Group Holdings, Inc..

In Oct 2010, Aioi Insurance Co., Ltd., Nissay Dowa Insurance Co., Ltd. were integrated of management as Aioi Nissay Dowa Insurance Co., Ltd.

In Feb 2020, MS & AD Holdings announced Noriyuki Hara as its next president.

References 

 
Companies listed on the Tokyo Stock Exchange
Companies listed on the Osaka Exchange
Insurance companies based in Tokyo
Sumitomo Group
Japanese companies established in 2008
Financial services companies established in 2008
Holding companies established in 2008
Holding companies based in Tokyo
Japanese brands